Always the Alibi ATA is an indie rock band based out of the Dallas–Fort Worth metroplex. Always the Alibi ranked #1 on Reverb Nation's Dallas Alternative chart in 2012 with EP "We Are Waiting". However, lead singer Henry Coke's battle with brain cancer in 2013 eventually brought the band to a standstill.

ATA returned in 2016, attempting to regain its earlier success. In recognition of Henry's time spent battling cancer, the band named their next release, “Reprieve,” and featured his radiation mask on the cover. Coupled with Grammy-nominated producer Chris “Frenchie” Smith, the release was featured on radio stations in the Dallas–Fort Worth metroplex, such as 97.1 The Eagle.

Discography

Studio albums 
 We Are Waiting (2012)
 Reprieve (2016)

Studio singles 
 Beautiful Girl (2012)
 Turning the Pages (2012)
 We Are Waiting (2012)
 After All I've Done (2016)
 Ain't Another Girl (2017)
 My Little Ghost (2017)
 Off the Grid (2019)
 Running in Circles (2019)
 Remember This (2020)
 Mackenzie (2020)
 This Scar from You (2021)
 Killing Me Inside (2022)

Music videos 
 After All I've Done (2016)
 Ain't Another Girl (2017),
 Off the Grid (2019),
 Running in Circles (2019)
 Remember This (2020)
 Mackenzie (2020)
 This Scar from You (2021)
 Killing Me Inside (2022)

References 

2012 in American music
Musical groups from Dallas
Indie rock musical groups from Texas